Jessica Walsh (born October 30, 1986) is an American designer, art director, illustrator and educator. She was a partner of the design studio Sagmeister & Walsh (2010–2019), and the founder of the creative agency &Walsh (2019–present). &Walsh is one of the .1% of creative agencies owned by women. She has taught at the School of Visual Arts (SVA).

Early life and education
Walsh was born on October 30, 1986 in New York and raised in Ridgefield, Connecticut. She began coding and designing websites at age 11. After a year of making her own websites and blogs, she made a website for kids to learn how to code using HTML and CSS and to make their own websites. Walsh became interested in coding from building a website homepage for her Neopet. Eventually her website had about 50,000 people visiting per day. She put Google Ads on her site and made a couple thousand dollars per month. This was a turning point for Walsh because she realized she could make money from design and websites. Walsh chose to go an art school to advance her design knowledge. Walsh went on to study graphic design at the Rhode Island School of Design (RISD), where she received a BFA degree in 2008.

Career
After earning her Bachelor of Fine Arts from RISD in 2008, Walsh moved to New York City to intern at the notable design firm Pentagram. She turned down a job at Apple where she was offered nearly $100,000 annually to accept the internship under Paula Scher at Pentagram, where she would stay for nearly a year. Walsh turned down the Apple job offer because she knew she would be doing one type of design for one client that already had an established look and feel. She knew her goal was to open her own studio and this job was not on the route to her goal.  She then worked as an associate art director at Print magazine and had design work and illustrations featured in various books, magazines and newspapers, including the New York Times and New York Times Magazine. In reflections about her time at Print magazine, she identifies it as one of the best things to happen in her career as it was how she found and developed her personal style.

Sagmeister & Walsh 
In February 2010, Jessica Walsh sent Stefan Sagmeister a “super-long, emotional email, unsure of where to go in life.” Walsh had never met Sagmeister before and the email only had the intention of trying to get some guidance. She admired his studio due to the emotional quality of the work and wanted his advice for starting a studio. They soon met up and Sagmeister looked through Walsh's portfolio and offered her a job. Two years later in 2012, she became partners with Stefan Sagmeister and thus Sagmeister & Walsh was born. This partnership was ideal because Walsh took over the client aspect of the business and this allowed Sagmeister to travel more and focus on his films.  In homage to a nude self-portrait Sagmeister had sent out to announce the formation of his own firm 19 years prior, the new partners released a photo of themselves naked in their office to announce the renaming of the firm to Sagmeister & Walsh.

Blending handcraft, photography and painting with digital design, Walsh works primarily on branding, typography, website design and art installations. Her signature style has been described as "bold, emotional and provocative" with the occasional surrealistic flourish, and her art has been said to look "hand-made and at times quite daring."  Walsh and Sagmeister collaborated on Six Things: Sagmeister & Walsh, an exhibition that opened at the Jewish Museum in March 2013, and ran for five months. For the exhibit, an exploration of happiness, they created a sound-activated sculpture and five short films.

Companies Sagmeister & Walsh Worked With 
Walsh has worked on projects for clients including Levi's, Aizone, Adobe and Colab Eyewear, and rebranding efforts for The Jewish Museum of New York and the Aldrich Contemporary Art Museum in Connecticut. Some other popular clients Walsh has worked with includes. BMW, Snapchat, Barneys New York and Parle Argo, “the Coca-Cola of India.”

&Walsh 
In July 2019, Walsh announced she was going to leave Sagmeister & Walsh and forming her own studio, &Walsh. Walsh has said that the studio is a fulfillment of her dreams as a teen to run her own business and the studio will become one of 36 female-led creative studios in the United States. The goal of &Walsh is to move beyond design and art direction and into deeper strategy and brand development work. &Walsh works with brands in early stages, advising on products, identifying audiences and helping to shape the brand from the ground up.

40 Days of Dating
In 2013, Walsh and fellow designer and friend Tim Goodman decided to date for 40 days to see if they could overcome their relationship issues and fall in love. They documented the social experiment on a website, 40 Days of Dating, launched in July 2013. The website is a blog and has entries from both Walsh and Goodman everyday answering the same questions throughout the 40 days.

They answered the same questions each day which were; 

 Did you see (the other person) today?
 What did y’all do together?
 Did anything interesting happen?
 Did you learn anything new about (the other person)?
 Did you learn anything about yourself?
 How do you feel about this relationship/project right now?
 Is there anything you want to do differently?
 Additional comments?

In support of the blog, which earned more than 5 million unique visitors in less than a year, they appeared in segments on talk shows Today and The View. In September 2013, Warner Brothers purchased the film rights, with a screenplay to be written by Lorene Scafaria, and Michael Sucsy attached to direct. Walsh and Goodman will serve as consulting writers on the script and also wrote a book for Abrams, 40 Days of Dating: An Experiment, out in early 2015. However, after many years of script revisions, Warner Bros. let the movie rights go. There are some new interests from different production companies and celebrities that are interested in starring in or producing a new project based on the book. This would be a long process due to having to start from scratch with new writers and producing a new script, so the movie may never be made.

12 Kinds of Kindness 
In 2016, Walsh and Goodman began a second project together, which they described as a "12-step experiment designed to open [their] hearts, eyes, and minds". They set up twelve tasks in which they displayed kindness to people and recorded the results. The experiment was live from January 13 to March 15, 2016.

Lets Talk About Mental Health 
Walsh has a project called Let's Talk About Mental Health that is on her 12 Kinds of Kindness website. This project tackles the stigma of sharing struggles with mental health. It contains posts of different people's honest accounts of dealing with mental illness. This project was inspired by Walsh's 12 Kinds of Kindness’ Step four; learning to forgive yourself for something in your past. In step four, Walsh writes about her past struggles with anorexia, depression and self-harm. Not only did she share her past struggles but so did her friends and colleagues. She published the stories on the website and invited everyone to add their stories through the website.

Ladies, Wine and Design 
Walsh started Ladies, Wine & Design, a nonprofit organization to encourage women and non-binary people to work together rather than compete, in 2016. Walsh created Ladies, Wine and Design in response to the statistic that in the creative industry only three percent of women are in leadership positions. This organization was born out of Walsh's personal experiences with sexism in the Design Industry, from both men and other women. Ladies, Wine and Design started out as eight women in Walsh's apartment drinking wine, talking about design, and discussing their careers as women in the industry. As of 2022, LWD has grown to have 280+ local chapters around the world. Each chapter is free to join and the events are free and accessible to all. LWD offers free mentorship circles, talks, and networking events around the world. The long term goal for the organization is to take their initiative to underserved high schools to foster the future of women, non-binary and underrepresented people in creative communities.

Other work
Walsh teaches design and typography at the School of Visual Arts in New York. She is represented by Creative Artists Agency.

Walsh worked on a project throughout the years called #SorryIHaveNoFilter. This project started out when she worked out at Sagmeister&Walsh. The project was based on Walsh's Instagram series with the same name. Now she has the No Filter project on her &Walsh website. This project has continued to grow with her throughout her career.

Walsh's Mindset and Work Ethic 
Walsh abides by a strong work ethic taught to her by her parents; work your ass off, respect people, take accountability, always be on time, meet deadlines, do what is needed to get the job done well, and never feel entitled to anything. Walsh prides herself on making great work. She says, this is only half of the game, the other half is understanding client relationships, working with clients, learning how to manage expectations, and making sure the work is a reflection of their brand and personality, no just you imposing your style on it.

Exhibitions
 Sagmeister: Another Show About Advertising and Promotion Materials, Les Arts Décoratifs, The Louvre, Paris, France, 2011-12
 The Happy Show, Institute of Contemporary Art, Philadelphia, PA; Museum of Contemporary Art, Los Angeles, CA; Chicago Cultural Center, Chicago, IL; Design Exchange, Toronto, Canada, 2012
 Six Things: Sagmeister & Walsh, The Jewish Museum, New York, NY, 2013
Sagmeister & Walsh: Beauty, MAK – Museum of Applied Arts Vienna, 2018/2019

Honors and awards
 New Star of Design, Computer Arts, 2010
 Society of Publication Designers award, 2010
 Young Gun Award, Art Directors Club, 2011
 New Visual Artist Award, Print magazine, 2011
 The Envy Index: 25 Under 25, The L Magazine, 2011 
 Type Director's Club Award, Les Arts Décoratifs poster, 2012
 Graphis, Design Annual 2012, Gold
 25 People Shaping the Future of Design, Complex, 2013
 People to Watch, GD USA, 2013
 Webby Award, Best Home/Welcome Page, Sagmeister & Walsh, 2014
 Graphis, Photography Annual 2015, Gold
 Forbes “30 Under 30: Art & Style” List, 2015

Personal life
Walsh lives in New York City with her husband, cinematographer Zak Mulligan. Walsh's sister, Lauren Walsh, works with Jessica at &Walsh. Lauren helps with running operations and new business. Her mom is a certified holistic health and wellness coach. Both Jessica and her sister Lauren suffer from Migraines.

References

External links
 &Walsh website
Sagmeister & Walsh website
 40 Days of Dating blog
12 Kinds of Kindness website

1986 births
Living people
American women graphic designers
Rhode Island School of Design alumni
School of Visual Arts faculty
Artists from New York City
American women academics
People from Ridgefield, Connecticut
American art directors
21st-century American women